Chief Pete Edochie, MON  (born March 7, 1947)  is a Nigerian actor. Edochie is considered one of Africa’s most talented actors, being honored with an Industry Merit Award by Africa Magic and Lifetime Achievement by Africa Film Academy Although a seasoned administrator and broadcaster, he came into prominence in the 1980s when he played the lead role of Okonkwo in a Nigerian Television Authority adaptation of Chinua Achebe’s all-time best selling novel, Things Fall Apart. Edochie descends from the Igbo people of Nigeria and is a Catholic. In 2003, he was honored as a Member of the Order of the Niger by President Olusegun Obasanjo.

Personal life 
Edochie was born in Zaria on March 7, 1947. He hails from Anambra and is married to Josephine Edochie. He educated at St. Patrick’s and St. James Primary School, Zaria, before proceeding to St. John’s College for his secondary education. He also schooled at the School of Journalism and Television in England. Edochie celebrated his 70th birthday in 2017 and he said he still feels strong despite having spent "3 scores and ten" years. "Taking life easy and planning purposefully for everything makes life worth living as well as ageing gracefully" he said. Pete Edochie is married with six children.

In 2009 Edochie was kidnapped and later released by his captors unharmed.

In September 2017, Edochie endorsed the Wikimedia movement in Nigeria by appearing in a video to increase awareness and use of Wikipedia among the older generations.

Career 

Edochie got into radio broadcasting in 1967 at the age of 20 as a junior programs assistant after which he was elevated to the level of a Director. He was director of programs, but doubling sometimes as Deputy Managing Director and occasionally acting as Managing Director. He quit Anambra Broadcasting Service (ABS) because the government decided to politicize the affairs of their FM station, thereby resulting in the entire management being asked to move out, including him. He was to be the immediate successor to the MD but had to leave and enroll into the movie industry. Prior to that, he had featured in Things Fall Apart and had won an International Award. The BBC flew into Nigeria to interview him for his role in Things Fall Apart. He is credited with over 18 movies to his name.

In 2005 the Actors Guild of Nigeria placed Edochie and several other actors, including Genevieve Nnaji, Omotola Jalade Ekeinde, Nkem Owoh, Ramsey Noah, Stella Damasus Aboderin, and Richard Mofe Damijo on a one-year ban from filming after they were said to have been collecting huge fees from producers due to their A-list celebrity status.

Filmography 

 Heavy Battle (2008)
 Test Your Heart (2008)
 Greatest Harvest (2007)
 Secret Pain (2007)
 Fair Game (2006)
 Holy Cross (2006)
 Lacrima (2006)
 Living with Death (2006) .... Mr. Harrison
 Passage of Kings (2006)
 Simple Baby (2006)
 Zoza (2006)
 Azima (2005)
 Baby Girl (2005)
 End of Money (2005)
 Living in Tears (2005)
 Never End (2005)
 No More War (2005)
 Ola... the Morning Sun (2005)
 Price of Ignorance (2005)
 The Price of Love: Life Is Beautiful (2005)
 Sacred Tradition (2005)
 The Tyrant (2005)
 Across the Niger (2004)
 Coronation (2004)
 Dogs Meeting (2004)  .... Anacho
 Dons in Abuja (2004)
 The Heart of Man (2004)
 King of the Jungle (2004)
 Love from Above (2004)
 My Desire (2004)
 Negative Influence (2004)
 The Staff of Odo (2004)
 St. Michael (2004)
 Above Death: In God We Trust (2003)
 Arrows (2003)
 Billionaire Club (2003)
 Egg of Life (2003)
 Honey (2003)
 Love & Politics (2003)
 Miserable Wealth (2003)
 The Omega (2003)
 Onunaeyi: Seeds of Bondage (2003)
 Rejected Son (2003)
 Selfish Desire (2003)
 Super Love (2003)
 Tears in the Sun (2003)
 Tunnel of Love (2003)
 When God Says Yes (2003)
 Battle Line (2002)
 My Love (2002)
 Tears & Sorrows (2002)
 Greedy Genius (2001)
 Holy Ghost Fire (2001)
 Terrible Sin (2001)
 Oduduwa (2000)
 Set-Up (2000)
 Chain Reaction (1999)
 Lost Kingdom (1999)
 Narrow Escape (1999)
 Living in Darkness (1999)
 Rituals (1997)
 Things Fall Apart (1987), TV series
 Last Ofalla
 Lion throne
 Lion of Africa
 Igodo
 Evil men
 Monkey chop banana
 Idemili
 50 days with Christ 
 The Egg
Unroyal (2020)
Lionheart (2018)
 Mummy Why (2016)

References

External links

 
 Interview with Pete Edochie at SunNewsOnline.com
 Pete Edochie official website

Igbo male actors
Living people
1947 births
Nigerian Roman Catholics
Male actors from Enugu State
20th-century Nigerian male actors
21st-century Nigerian male actors
Nigerian male television actors
Nigerian male film actors
Lifetime Achievement Award Africa Movie Academy Award winners
Members of the Order of the Niger
Actors from Anambra State
African actors